Wantem is a village in Kiwirok Timur district, Pegunungan Bintang Regency in Highland Papua province, Indonesia. Its population is 186.

Climate
Wantem has a very wet subtropical highland climate (Cfb) with very heavy rainfall year-round.

References

Villages in Highland Papua